The New South Wales Individual Speedway Championship is a Motorcycle speedway championship held annually in New South Wales to determine the NSW State champion. The event is organised by the NSW Solo Riders' Association and is sanctioned by Motorcycling Australia (MA).

Billy Sanders from Sydney holds the record for the most number of NSW Championship wins with eight between 1976 and 1985. From his first win in 1976 until his last win in 1985, with the exception of 1983 when no title was run, Sanders was the only winner of the NSW title. Aub Lawson, Craig Boyce and Chris Holder are next with five wins. Only Holder, the reigning champion (2011), is still actively racing.

Seven international riders have won the NSW Solo Championship. Tiger Stevenson (England - 1934), Jack Milne (USA - 1937), Wilbur Lamoreaux (USA - 1938), Jack Parker (England - 1951 & 1952), Ken McKinlay (Scotland - 1960), Eric Boocock (England - 1968) and Ole Olsen (Denmark - 1972).

Unless stated, all riders are from New South Wales

Winners since 1930/31
All riders from NSW unless otherwise stated.

References

External links
Honor Roll since 1930/31

Motorsport competitions in Australia
Speedway in Australia
Motorsport in New South Wales